Naftokhimik Prykarpattya (formerly Nadvirnyansky Oil Refinery) is one of the oldest oil refineries in Ukraine, built in 1897, with a capacity of about 2.6 million tons of crude oil per year as of 2005. PJSC Naftokhimik Prykarpattya is one of the six oil refineries in Ukraine and the only one that works with Ukrainian raw materials.

References

Privat Group
Companies established in 1887
Oil refineries in Ukraine
Nadvirna
History of Ivano-Frankivsk Oblast